Polygonum humifusum is an Asian and North American species of plants in the buckwheat family. It grows in arctic and subarctic regions of eastern Russia, Mongolia, northeastern China, Alaska, and Canada (Yukon, Northwest Territory, Nunavut, British Columbia, northern Ontario).

Polygonum humifusum is a branching herb with erect or reclining stems up to 30 cm (1 foot) tall. Flowers are green, pink, or white, produced in groups of 2–5. It grows in fields and on riverbanks at elevations less than 400 m (1300 feet).

References

humifusum
Flora of Alaska
Flora of Siberia
Flora of the Russian Far East
Flora of Canada
Plants described in 1850
Flora without expected TNC conservation status